Joseph P. Tulley  (August 17, 1922 – November 14, 2003) was an American politician. He served as a member of the Ohio House of Representatives for the 59th District from 1967 to 1976. Tulley served in World War II as well as the Korean War, and owned a radio station. He was a lawyer.

References

1922 births
2003 deaths
Republican Party members of the Ohio House of Representatives
20th-century American politicians
American military personnel of World War II
American military personnel of the Korean War